Tony Bennett: The Playground is an album by Tony Bennett, released in 1998.

Track listing
"The Playground" (Alan Bergman, Marilyn Bergman, Bill Evans) – 3:36
"Ac-Cent-Tchu-Ate The Positive" (Harold Arlen, Johnny Mercer) – 2:37
"Dat Dere" (Oscar Brown Jr., Bobby Timmons) – 3:17
"Little Things" - Duet with Elmo (Joe Raposo) – 3:09
"Put On a Happy Face" - Duet with Rosie O'Donnell (Charles Strouse, Lee Adams) (From the musical Bye Bye Birdie) – 3:01
"Because We're Kids" (Dr. Seuss, Frederick Hollander) – 3:25
"My Mom" (Walter Donaldson) – 4:38
"Swinging on a Star" (Johnny Burke, Jimmy Van Heusen) – 2:04
"Bein' Green" - Duet with Kermit The Frog (Raposo) – 2:41
"Firefly" - Duet with Kermit The Frog (Cy Coleman, Carolyn Leigh) – 1:32
"When You Wish Upon a Star" (Leigh Harline, Ned Washington) – 2:58
"(It's Only) A Paper Moon" (Arlen, Yip Harburg, Billy Rose) – 2:49
"The Inchworm" (Frank Loesser) – 2:41
"The Bare Necessities" (Terry Gilkyson) – 2:09
"Make The World Your Own" (Alan Bergman, Marilyn Bergman, Michel Legrand) – 3:48
"All God's Chillun Got Rhythm" (Walter Jurmann, Gus Kahn, Bronislaw Kaper) – 2:10
"It's Christmas in Herald Square" (Tony Tamburello/Joyce Vintaloro) – 3:25

Personnel
 Tony Bennett – vocals
 Ralph Sharon – piano
 Gray Sargent – guitar
 Paul Langosch – double bass
 Clayton Cameron – drums

References

1997 albums
Tony Bennett albums
Columbia Records albums
Albums produced by Phil Ramone